This is the discography of Ada Jones, who released a total of 128 hit singles; of those, 20 with Len Spencer, 43 with Billy Murray, one with Billy Murray & Frank Stanley, one with Victor Light Opera Co., one with American Quartet, one with Billy Murray & American Quartet, seven with Walter Van Brunt, two with Peerless Quartet, two with Henry Burr, one with Billy Watkins, two with Will Robbins, one with M.J. O'Connell, one with Cal Stewart, one with Cal Stewart & Peerless Quartet, and 44 solo.

Discography

Hit singles

See also
List of songs recorded by Ada Jones

References

Pop music discographies